Anthony Darrin Govens  (born January 5, 1988) is an American-Hungarian professional basketball player for DEAC of the Nemzeti Bajnokság I/A, the top division in Hungary.

Early career
Govens was named the Class 4A Pennsylvania Player of the Year in both 2005 and 2006 was a 2006 All-State 1st Team selection by Associated Press, along with teammate Garrett Williamson in high school.

College career
During his sophomore year in college, he averaged 9.8 points per game. He scored 1,360 points over his four-year career. His career high came against La Salle University when he scored 26 points. He was not drafted in the 2010 NBA D-League Draft, but made the Reno Bighorns roster.

Professional career
Govens played for Þór Þorlákshöfn in the Úrvalsdeild karla during the 2011–2012 season. He was named the best player of the first half of the season after averaging 25.0 points and 4.3 assists in the first 11 games and leading Þór to a 7–4 record. He was named to the Icelandic All-Star game in January 2012 where he scored 12 points.

He returned to Þór in January 2015, replacing Vee Sanford.

On September 3, 2019, he has signed with Alba Fehérvár of the Hungarian League. Govens averaged 12.4 points, 2.4 rebounds and 3.3 assists per game. On August 17, 2020, he signed with Szedeák.

On July 26, 2021, he has signed with Cholet Basket of the LNB Pro A.

On July 27, 2022, he has signed with Limoges CSP of the LNB Pro A.

On November 10, 2022, he signed with SLUC Nancy Basket of the French Pro A.

National team career
In 2017, Govens played with the Hungarian national basketball team.

References

1988 births
Living people
Alba Fehérvár players
American expatriate basketball people in Belarus
American expatriate basketball people in France
American expatriate basketball people in Greece
American expatriate basketball people in Hungary
American expatriate basketball people in Iceland
American expatriate basketball people in Israel
American men's basketball players
Basketball players from Pennsylvania
BC Körmend players
BC Nizhny Novgorod players
BC Tsmoki-Minsk players
Chester High School alumni
Cholet Basket players
Falco KC Szombathely players
Hungarian men's basketball players
Ikaros B.C. players
Ironi Kiryat Ata players
Limoges CSP players
Point guards
Reno Bighorns players
Saint Joseph's Hawks men's basketball players
SLUC Nancy Basket players
Sportspeople from Chester, Pennsylvania
Þór Þorlákshöfn (basketball club) players
Úrvalsdeild karla (basketball) players
ZTE KK players
Naturalized citizens of Hungary
Debreceni EAC (basketball) players